SMS Prinz Eugen was the second member of the  built for the Austrian Navy in the 1860s. Her keel was laid in October 1861 at the Stabilimento Tecnico Triestino shipyard; she was launched in June 1862, and was completed in March 1863.

Prinz Eugen saw action at the Battle of Lissa in July 1866. There she engaged the Italian ironclad fleet; she did not inflict any serious damage, though she emerged from the battle similarly unscathed. After the war, Prinz Eugen was modernized slightly in 1867 to correct her poor seakeeping and improve her armament, but she was nevertheless rapidly outpaced by naval developments in the 1860s and 1870s. Obsolescent by 1873, Prinz Eugen was officially "rebuilt", though in actuality she was broken up for scrap, with only her armor plate, parts of her machinery, and other miscellaneous parts being reused in the new .

Design

She displaced . She had a crew of 386. Her propulsion system consisted of one single-expansion steam engine that drove a single screw propeller. The number and type of her coal-fired boilers have not survived.

Prinz Eugen was a broadside ironclad, and she was armed with a main battery of sixteen 48-pounder muzzle-loading guns and fifteen 24-pounder  rifled muzzle-loading guns. She also carried a single 12-pounder gun and a six-pounder.

Service history
The keel for Prinz Eugen was laid down at the Stabilimento Tecnico Triestino shipyard in October 1861. She was launched on 14 June 1862, and after fitting-out work was completed in March 1863, she was commissioned into the Austrian fleet. Owing to her open bow, she took on water excessively and as a result, tended to handle poorly. During the Second Schleswig War in 1864, Prinz Eugen and the two s remained in the Adriatic to protect Austria's coastline while a squadron was sent to the North Sea to attack Denmark. In June 1866, Italy declared war on Austria, as part of the Third Italian War of Independence, which was fought concurrently with the Austro-Prussian War. Rear Admiral Wilhelm von Tegetthoff brought the Austrian fleet to Ancona on 27 June, in an attempt to draw out the Italians, but the Italian commander, Admiral Carlo Pellion di Persano, refused to engage Tegetthoff.

Battle of Lissa

On 16 July, Persano took the Italian fleet out of Ancona and steamed to the island of Lissa, where they arrived on the 18th. With the main fleet of twelve ironclads, they brought troop transports carrying 3,000 soldiers. Persano then spent the next two days bombarding the Austrian defenses of the island and unsuccessfully attempting to force a landing. Tegetthoff received a series of telegrams between the 17 and 19 July notifying him of the Italian attack, which he initially believed to be a feint to draw the Austrian fleet away from its main bases at Pola and Venice. By the morning of the 19th, however, he was convinced that Lissa was in fact the Italian objective, and so he requested permission to attack. As Tegetthoff's fleet arrived off Lissa on the morning of 20 July, Persano's fleet was arrayed for another landing attempt. The latter's ships were divided into three groups, with only the first two able to concentrate in time to meet the Austrians. Tegetthoff had arranged his ironclad ships into a wedge-shaped formation, with Prinz Eugen on his right flank; the wooden warships of the second and third divisions followed behind in the same formation.

While he was forming up his ships, Persano transferred from his flagship,  to the turret ship . This created a gap in the Italian line, and Tegetthoff seized the opportunity to divide the Italian fleet and create a melee. He made a pass through the gap, but failed to ram any of the Italian ships, forcing him to turn around and make another attempt. During the first approach, Prinz Eugen opened fire with her bow guns but did not score any hits. As soon as her main battery could be brought to bear, she fired concentrated broadsides at unidentified Italian vessels. Affondatore passed close to Prinz Eugen but failed to ram her or score any hits on the Austrian vessel.

By this time, Re d'Italia had been rammed and sunk and the coastal defense ship  was burning badly, soon to be destroyed by a magazine explosion. Persano broke off the engagement, and though his ships still outnumbered the Austrians, he refused to counter-attack with his badly demoralized forces. In addition, the fleet was low on coal and ammunition. The Italian fleet began to withdraw, followed by the Austrians; Tegetthoff, having gotten the better of the action, kept his distance so as not to risk his success. As night began to fall, the opposing fleets disengaged completely, heading for Ancona and Pola, respectively. The Italians had failed to inflict serious damage on any of the Austrian ironclads, including Prinz Eugen. That evening, Prinz Eugen, the ironclad , and a pair of gunboats patrolled outside the harbor.

Later career
After returning to Pola, Tegetthoff kept his fleet in the northern Adriatic, where it patrolled against a possible Italian attack. The Italian ships never came, and on 12 August, the two countries signed the Armistice of Cormons; this ended the fighting and led to the Treaty of Vienna. Though Austria had defeated Italy at Lissa and on land at the Battle of Custoza, the Austrian army was decisively defeated by Prussia at the Battle of Königgrätz. As a result, Austria, which became Austria-Hungary in the Ausgleich of 1867, was forced to cede the city of Venice to Italy. In the immediate aftermath of the war, the bulk of the Austrian fleet was decommissioned and disarmed.

The fleet embarked on a modest modernization program after the war, primarily focused on re-arming the ironclads with new rifled guns. Prinz Eugen was rebuilt in 1867, particularly to correct her poor sea-keeping. Her open bow was plated over and she was rearmed with twelve  muzzleloaders manufactured by Armstrong and two  4-pounder guns. By 1873, the ship was obsolescent and had a thoroughly-rotted hull, so the Austro-Hungarian Navy decided to replace the ship. Parliamentary objection to granting funds for new ships forced the navy to resort to subterfuge to replace the ship. Reconstruction projects were routinely approved by the parliament, so the navy officially "rebuilt" Prinz Eugen and her sister ships. In reality, only some parts of the engines, armor plate, and other miscellaneous parts were salvaged from the ships, with work beginning at the Pola Navy Yard in November 1873. The new vessels were given the same names of the old vessels in an attempt to conceal their origin.

Notes

References
 
 
 
 
 

Kaiser Max-class ironclads (1862)
1862 ships